Ri Chang-ha (born 23 August 1972), also known as Li Chang-ha, is a North Korean former footballer. He represented North Korea on at least two occasions in 1998, scoring twice. He was part of the squad at the 1998 Asian Games.

Career statistics

International

International goals
Scores and results list North Korea's goal tally first, score column indicates score after each North Korea goal.

References

1972 births
Living people
North Korean footballers
North Korea youth international footballers
North Korea international footballers
Association football midfielders
Pyongyang Sports Club players
Footballers at the 1998 Asian Games
Asian Games competitors for North Korea